Ramon Franco may refer to:

Ramón Franco (actor) (born 1968), actor known for his portrayal of Alberto Ruiz in the TV series Tour of Duty
Ramón Franco (1896–1938), Spanish pioneer of aviation